James Ellis Rich (December 22, 1869 – October 20, 1961) was a Massachusetts politician who served as the 33rd mayor of Lynn, Massachusetts from 1909 to 1910.

Before he was elected mayor, Rich was a motorman and later foreman of a car barn of the Boston and Northern Street Railway.

Notes

1869 births
1961 deaths
Mayors of Lynn, Massachusetts
Massachusetts Democrats